Sugar Creek is a stream in Grundy and Harrison Counties in the U.S. state of Missouri. It is a tributary of the Thompson River.

Sugar Creek was so named on account of the sugar maple timber lining its course.

See also
List of rivers of Missouri

References

Rivers of Grundy County, Missouri
Rivers of Harrison County, Missouri
Rivers of Missouri